Peel en Maas has been a new municipality in the southeastern Netherlands since 1 January 2010. It is situated in the province of Limburg. The municipality is formed by the towns of Panningen, Helden, Kessel, Kessel-Eik, Maasbree, Baarlo, Beringe, Egchel, Grashoek, Koningslust, and Meijel. It has a population of more than 40.000 people from various backgrounds. The municipality has several facilities such as a high school, public library, swimming pool, and a well connected public bus transport system. 

Each town has its own characteristics. The municipality's official slogan is: "beleef de ruimte!" (experience the space!).

History 
The towns are situated in the Dutch province of Limburg. This province was part of the southern Catholic parts of the Low Lands. The towns used to be under Belgian, German, and eventually Dutch rule. Each town has a strong local identity and there is a healthy rivalry during the annual carnaval festivities.

Sightseeing 
The municipality has several noteworthy places to visit.   
 To the right is the Maas river with a boulevard in the city of Kessel  
 To the south is the Musschenberg and the Weerdbeemden natural reserve. Along this path is a former Roman street where Roman coins have been found.   
 Castle the Keverberg (Kessel)  
 Sint Antonius Windmill (Kessel)  
 Castle the Berckt (Baarlo)

Topography

Dutch Topographic map of the municipality of Peel en Maas, June 2015

Notable people 

 Johannes Eillebrecht (1888 in Helden – 1954) a Greco-Roman wrestler, competed at the 1912 and the 1920 Summer Olympics
 Jan Hendrix (born 1949 in Maasbree) a Dutch-born artist, lives and works in Mexico
 Leon Thijssen (born 1968 in Baarlo) a Dutch show jumper
 Mustafa Amhaouch (born 1970 in Panningen) a Dutch politician
 Mark Verheijen (born 1976 in Baarlo) a Dutch former politician
 Martin Porter (born 1983 in Maasbree) a Dutch artist and songwriter 
 Bert Selen (born 1985 in Kessel-Eik) music producer, TV/film composer, instrumentalist and songwriter 
 Jorrit Hendrix (born 1995 in Panningen) a Dutch footballer

References

External links 
 

 
Municipalities of Limburg (Netherlands)
Municipalities of the Netherlands established in 2010